Marie-Françoise Plissart (born 13 July 1954) is a Belgian photographer and video artist.

She explored the photo novel format, collaborating with the comic artist Benoît Peeters in several projects. Plissart is also known as an architecture photographer. She won a Golden Lion at the  2004 Venice Biennale of Architecture for the exhibition "Kinshasa:The Imaginary City".

Books 
 Fugues (with Benoît Peeters), éditions de Minuit, 1983
 Droit de regards (after a lecture by Jacques Derrida), éditions de Minuit, 1985; nouvelle édition: Les Impressions Nouvelles, 2010. (English edition: Rights of Inspection:Monacelli Press)
 Prague (en collaboration avec Benoît Peeters), Autrement, 1985
 Le mauvais œil (in collaboration with Benoît Peeters), éditions de Minuit, 1986
 Aujourd'hui, éditions Arboris, 1993
 Bruxelles, horizon vertical, éditions Prisme, 1998
 Kinshasa, récits de la ville invisible, éditions La Renaissance du Livre/Luc Pire, 2005.
 Mons (in collaboration with Caroline Lamarche, Les Impressions Nouvelles, 2009.

Expositions

Individual 
 Droit de regards: Vienna (Musée d'Art Moderne, December 1985), Toulouse (Ombres blanches, March 1986), Berlin (Litteraturhaus, October 1986), the Hague(Centre culturel français, January 1987), Amsterdam (Maison Descartes, March 1987)
 À la recherche du roman-photo: Bruxelles (Palais des Beaux-Arts, June–July 1987), Rotterdam (galerie Perspektief, September 1987), Liège (les Chiroux, January 1989), Geneva (Saint-Gervais, November 1989)
 Aujourd’hui, Charleroi: Charleroi, Musée de la Photographie, Octobre 1993)
Bruxelles brûle-t-il ?: Brussels (KunstenFESTIVALdesArts, Beursschouwburg, May 1994)
Martini, Martini, Bxl, Beursschouwburg: Brussels (KunstenFESTIVALdesArts, May 1996)
Photo narrative: Eastern Michigan University (Art department, November 1996)
Brussel’s architecture: Osaka (International House, October 1997)
Bruxelles, Horizon vertical: Bruxelles (Le Botanique, January 1999)
Kinshasa, the imaginary city: Venice (Biennale of Architecture, September 2004), Brussels (Bozar, June–September 2005), Johannesburg (June 2006)
 A World without end, rétrospective personnelle, Musée de la photographie d'Anvers (2008).

References 

1954 births
Living people
20th-century Belgian women artists
21st-century Belgian women artists
20th-century women photographers
21st-century women photographers
Photographers from Brussels
Belgian women photographers
Belgian video artists